The Historical, Vintage, and Classical Cars Museum is located in Kuwait's Shuwaikh Industrial Area, near the intersection of road 80 and road 55.

History and profile
It consists of two buildings and an outside display area:

 one building houses the permanent exhibition of 30 restored important cars;
 another building contains a traffic parkour where children can practice their driving skills in electric cars;
 outside of both buildings there is a collection of less important cars in various conditions, including a "barn find" Ford Model T.

Additional cars are displayed on loan in other museums in Kuwait, e.g. the Bait al-Othman museum in Hawally.

The main collection can be grouped into 4 parts:

 the display of former state limousines of Kuwait
 state limousines from other countries or from Royal households
 a collection of 3 Aston Martins related to James Bond movies
 other important cars owned by the museum or by private collectors (including 2 Minervas from 1904 and 1924)

The museum is closed on Fridays and open on all other days 9:00 - 12:00 in the morning and 5:00 - 8:00 in the evening.

See also
 List of museums in Kuwait

References

External links 
Kuwait Motor Network
Official Instagram account
Official website with location map

2010 establishments in Kuwait
Museums established in 2010
Museums in Kuwait
Automotive museums
History of Kuwait